Avrankou Omnisport FC  are a Beninese football club based in Avrankou. They currently play in the Benin Premier League for 2014–15 season.

References 

Football clubs in Benin